Komissarovka is a rural locality (a selo) in Velikoknyazevsky Selsoviet of Belogorsky District, Amur Oblast, Russia. The population was 94 as of 2018. There are 3 streets.

Geography 
Komissarovka is located 58 km west of Belogorsk (the district's administrative centre) by road. Velikoknyazevka is the nearest rural locality.

References 

Rural localities in Belogorsky District